Schnéevoigt is a surname. Notable people with the surname include:

 Alf Schnéevoigt (1915–1982), Danish photographer
 Ernst Schnéevoigt, German-born conductor 
 Georg Schnéevoigt, Finnish conductor
 George Schnéevoigt, Danish film director
 Siri Schnéevoigt (1893–1961), Danish actor